Charles Dwayne McElroy Sr. (born October 1, 1967), is an American former professional baseball player who was a relief pitcher in Major League Baseball from 1989 to 2001.

Personal life
In June 2011, his son C.J. McElroy was selected by the St. Louis Cardinals in the 3rd round of the 2011 MLB Draft.

External links

Major League Baseball pitchers
Philadelphia Phillies players
Chicago Cubs players
Cincinnati Reds players
California Angels players
Anaheim Angels players
Chicago White Sox players
Colorado Rockies players
New York Mets players
Baltimore Orioles players
San Diego Padres players
Baseball players from Texas
1967 births
Living people